Mikhail Konstantinovich Shcherbakov (born on March 27, 1963) is a prominent Russian poet, songwriter and bard. He was born in Obninsk. He graduated from Moscow State University and now lives in Moscow. Shcherbakov started writing songs in 1978. Since then he has written more than 400 songs and lyrics. He has recorded 20 CD albums and more than 20 audio tapes.

External links 
 Unofficial Mikhail Shcherbakov site
 Songs by Mikhail Shcherbakov
 Links to CDs by Shcherbakov
 15 songs by Mikhail Shcherbakov, sings Lidia Cheboksarova

1963 births
Living people
Moscow State University alumni
Russian bards
Russian male poets
Russian singer-songwriters
Singers from Moscow
Russian male singer-songwriters
Soviet songwriters
Soviet child singers
Russian child singers
20th-century Russian male singers
20th-century Russian singers